Deborah Tobias Poritz (born October 26, 1936) is an American jurist. She was the Chief Justice of the New Jersey Supreme Court from 1996 to 2006, and was the Attorney General of New Jersey from 1994 to 1996, in both cases becoming the first woman to serve in that position.

Early life and teaching
Poritz was born in Brooklyn, New York and graduated from James Madison High School in 1954 and Brooklyn College in 1958. She became a Woodrow Wilson Fellow in English and American Literature at Columbia University. Poritz became an English teacher at Ursinus College.

Legal career 
After graduating from the University of Pennsylvania Law School in 1977 at age 40, Poritz became a Deputy Attorney General in the New Jersey Department of Law and Public Safety. In 1981, she was named as the Assistant Chief of the Environmental Protection Section. She later served as Deputy Attorney General in Charge of Appeals, Chief of the Banking, Insurance and Public Securities Section, and later as Director of the Division of Law, and finally she was named the Chief Counsel to Governor of New Jersey Thomas Kean. From 1990 to 1994, Poritz was a partner in the Princeton law firm of Jamieson, Moore, Peskin & Spicer.

Poritz was the first woman to serve as Attorney General of New Jersey. She was nominated to the position by Governor of New Jersey Christine Todd Whitman in January 1994. As Attorney General, she oversaw the divisions of Law, Criminal Justice, Gaming Enforcement, Motor Vehicles, Consumer Affairs, Civil Rights and the New Jersey State Police. She served as attorney general until she took office as chief justice.

Poritz was nominated to be Chief Justice by Governor Whitman on June 20, 1996, and was confirmed on June 27, 1996. She was sworn in as the first female Chief Justice of the New Jersey Supreme Court on July 10, 1996.  Poritz served until October 25, 2006, when she retired, due to New Jersey's mandatory retirement age for judges.

As of December 2008, Poritz is of counsel to the Princeton office of Drinker, Biddle & Reath. Poritz served as one of seven members of the Judicial Advisory Panel until 2010 when she and the other members of the panel resigned to protest Governor Chris Christie's decision not to renominate Supreme Court Justice John Wallace. The resigning panel criticized the decision as an encroachment on judicial independence.

In 2011, Poritz joined the Rutgers School of Law in Newark and in Camden as a resident professor.

In 2016, at a Princeton Public Library book discussion, Poritz criticized governor and candidate for president Chris Christie, saying that she did not see a legacy of his governance.

Awards and honors 
The American Civil Liberties Union of New Jersey gave Poritz the Roger Baldwin Award, the organization's highest honor, in 2007.

Personal life 
Poritz is married to Alan, a mathematician. The couple has two sons.

See also
List of female state attorneys general in the United States

References

External links 
 Deborah Poritz at Drinker Biddle
 Deborah Poritz at Jewish Women's Archive

American women judges
Chief Justices of the Supreme Court of New Jersey
New Jersey Attorneys General
New Jersey Republicans
People from Brooklyn
Brooklyn College alumni
Columbia University alumni
University of Pennsylvania Law School alumni
1936 births
Living people
Women chief justices of state supreme courts in the United States
James Madison High School (Brooklyn) alumni
20th-century American Jews
21st-century American Jews
21st-century American women
20th-century American women judges
20th-century American judges
21st-century American women judges
21st-century American judges